Sundaram Ramakrishnan was  an Indian space scientist and a former director of Vikram Sarabhai Space Centre, who is known to have contributed to the development of Polar Satellite Launch Vehicle (PSLV). He has served the Indian Space Research Organization for over 40 years.

Ramakrishnan, who is credited with several scientific papers on space science, was honoured by the Government of India in 2003 with the Padma Shri, the fourth-highest Indian civilian award.

References

Further reading
 

Recipients of the Padma Shri in science & engineering
Living people
Indian Space Research Organisation people
Indian aerospace engineers
Indian scientific authors
Engineers from Kerala
20th-century Indian engineers
Year of birth missing (living people)